The Journal of Ancient History (Russian: Вестник Древней Истории, Vestnik Drevnei Istorii) is a Russian bulletin founded in 1937. It publishes articles mainly on Ancient Orient, Ancient Greece, Ancient Rome, and recent archeological digs. It comes out four times a year. Circulation: over 3,000 copies (1971). The journal was established by the Georgian scholar and Bolshevik party functionary (as well as Joseph Stalin's former brother in law) Alexander Svanidze.

External links 
 Content 1937-2009 (in Russian)

Classics journals
Archaeology journals
Science and technology in the Soviet Union
Science and technology in Russia
Publications established in 1937
Quarterly journals
1937 establishments in the Soviet Union
Russian Academy of Sciences academic journals